La Labor is a municipality in the Honduran department of Ocotepeque. 

It is one of five municipalities within the Mancomunidad Guisayote (http://www.mancomunidadguisayote.hn/).

Demographics
At the time of the 2013 Honduras census, La Labor municipality had a population of 9,515. Of these, 99.25% were Mestizo, 0.43% Indigenous, 0.24% Black or Afro-Honduran, 0.06% White and 0.01% others.

References

Municipalities of the Ocotepeque Department